David Hunter (23 February 1860 – 11 January 1927) was part of a lineage of Yorkshire County Cricket Club wicket-keepers, stretching on through Arthur Dolphin to Arthur Wood, Jimmy Binks and David Bairstow.  Hunter played 517 first-class games for Yorkshire between 1888 and 1909.

Life and career
Born in Scarborough, Yorkshire, England, Hunter also appeared in first-class cricket for Lord Hawke's XI (1889), North of England (1889–1907), L Hall's XI (1889), Players (1890–1909), Hurst Park Club (1890), L Hall's Yorkshire XI (1891), XI of Yorkshire (1894), Over 30 (1901), CI Thornton's XI (1902–1905), Lancashire and Yorkshire (1903–1909), Rest of England (1904) and Lord Londesborough's XI (1909).

In 552 matches in total, he took 913 catches and completed 350 stumpings.  A modest right-handed tailend batsman, he compiled 4,538 runs at an average of 12.03, with a best of 58 not out against Worcestershire.  Over the years, he held up his end in stands of 53, 148, 121, 118 and 102 for the tenth wicket. He did bowl 42 balls as well, conceding 43 runs and not taking a wicket.

He succeeded his brother Joe Hunter as the Yorkshire wicket-keeper at the relatively late age of 28, but was then an almost ever present player for the following two decades. It is a testament to his 'good hands' that he never suffered a serious finger injury, nor were his hands damaged at the end of his career, despite the comparatively crude equipment and heavy workload of the time.  In Louis Hall's benefit match against Surrey at Sheffield in 1891, he caught five men and stumped one in an innings, and against the same county seven years later, claimed eight of the twenty wickets, catching two and stumping six at Bradford.  He was a doughty performer right up to the end of his career, making six catches in an innings, again against Surrey, at Headingley in his last year.

He helped Yorkshire win the County Championship eight times, and received £1,975 from his benefit in the Roses match  against Lancashire at Bradford in 1897.

Hunter died in January 1927 in Northstead, Scarborough, at the age of 66.

References

External links

Cricinfo Profile

1860 births
1927 deaths
Yorkshire cricketers
Cricketers from Scarborough, North Yorkshire
English cricketers of 1864 to 1889
English cricketers of 1890 to 1918
English cricketers
Players cricketers
Lord Hawke's XI cricketers
North v South cricketers
C. I. Thornton's XI cricketers
Hurst Park Club cricketers
Lord Londesborough's XI cricketers
Wicket-keepers